Juju Factory  is a 2007 film.

Synopsis 
Kongo lives in Brussels, in the Matongé district on which he is writing a book. His editor wants a kind of traveler's book spiced with ethnic ingredients. However, the writer is inspired by the vision of the complex and tormented souls that he meets everywhere, night and day. Kongo Congo follows invisible threads connected to Congolese history and its ghosts. How is it possible to hold on in this chaotic history? By having juju, self-confidence, and Beatrice's love.

Awards
 Innsbruck 2007
 Zanzíbar 2007
 Kenya 2007
 Pays d’APT 2007
 Ecrans Noirs Cameroun 2008

Carole Karemera won Best Actress at Bari 2007, and Dieudonne Kabongo Bashila won Best Actor at Ecrans Noirs 2008.

References

External links 

 

2007 films
Democratic Republic of the Congo drama films
Creative Commons-licensed films